James Wyllie (8 July 1818 – 5 April 1899) was a Scottish draughts player who is important to the history of the game. He is often nicknamed "The Herd Laddie". For many years the date of his birth was uncertain. The day was thought to have been 6 July and 1818 and 1820 were both candidates for the year. However, in 2005 research at the National Archives confirmed the correct date.

References

External links
The Herd Laddie (a full biography)
Draughts history
19th century players including Wyllie

Scottish draughts players
Players of English draughts
1818 births
1899 deaths